Potamites juruazensis is a species of lizard in the family Gymnophthalmidae. It is found in western Brazil (Acre) and Peru.

References

Potamites
Lizards of South America
Reptiles of Brazil
Reptiles of Peru
Reptiles described in 1998
Taxa named by Teresa C.S. Ávila-Pires
Taxa named by Laurie J. Vitt